The Turía is a small river in Galicia, Spain. It rises in the town of Taramundi (Asturias) and drains into the Eo River in the town of A Pontenova (Lugo Province).

The Turía river gives its name to the Turía Valley or “Valle del Turía” that crosses horizontally before emptying into the Eo River. The Turía River is fed by numerous streams and creeks from the mountains above the valley, and is part of the Eo UNESCO biosphere reserve.

While the river has its source in Asturias, the major part of its course is in Lugo province.

The Turía River is a source of industry and its waters are used to generate socio-economic activities based on ancient traditions such as Navajeros crafts and textiles, as well as the primary industry of salmon farming in A Pontenova.

See also
 Rivers of Galicia

References
 Infoasturias.com Electronic tourism brochure edited by the Asturias Council Tourism Department.

External links
 www.turiavalley.com 

Rivers of Spain
Rivers of Asturias
Rivers of Galicia (Spain)